Frank Baines (born 16 July 1995, in Liverpool) is a Scottish and British retired artistic gymnast.

Baines represented Scotland at the 2014 Commonwealth Games in Glasgow. As part of the Scotland team, he won a silver medal in the Team competition. In 2018 in the Gold Coast he won bronze medals in the team event and on parallel bars.

In 2019, Baines was the Scottish Senior All-Around Champion.

References

External links
 

Living people
1995 births
British male artistic gymnasts
Commonwealth Games silver medallists for Scotland
Scottish gymnasts
Commonwealth Games medallists in gymnastics
Gymnasts at the 2018 Commonwealth Games
Gymnasts at the 2014 Commonwealth Games
European Games competitors for Great Britain
Gymnasts at the 2015 European Games
Commonwealth Games bronze medallists for Scotland
Gymnasts at the 2022 Commonwealth Games
Medallists at the 2014 Commonwealth Games
Medallists at the 2018 Commonwealth Games